The 2023 North Carolina Tar Heels baseball team represents the University of North Carolina at Chapel Hill in the 2023 NCAA Division I baseball season. The Tar Heels play their home games at Boshamer Stadium, and are a member of the Atlantic Coast Conference. They are led by head coach Scott Forbes, who is in his third season. He is assisted by Bryant Gaines, Jesse Wierzbicki, and Jason Howell. Dave Arendas serves as director of operations.

Previous season

In Forbes' second year at the helm, the Tar Heels improved from their 2021 campaign. Finishing the season 42–22, the 2022 Tar Heels won the ACC Tournament and hosted both an NCAA Tournament Regional and Super Regional. Freshman sensation Vance Honeycutt broke out in a big way, leading the Tar Heels in many batting statistics en route to winning the ACC Freshman of the Year award. They were swept by Arkansas in the Chapel Hill Super Regional, denying Forbes his first College World Series appearance as a head coach.

Personnel

Roster
Class Listing as reflected on GoHeels.com

Coaching Staff

Schedule and results 

! style="" | Regular Season
|- valign="top"

|-bgcolor="#ffdddd"
| February 17 || Seton Hall* || No. 12 || Boshamer Stadium • Chapel Hill, NC || 8–10 || Payero (1–0) || Eaise (0–1) || None || 2,582 || 0–1 || –
|-bgcolor="#ddffdd"
| February 18 || Seton Hall* || No. 12 || Boshamer Stadium • Chapel Hill, NC || 11–2 || Padgett (1–0) || Frontera (0–1) || None || 3,049 || 1–1 || –
|-bgcolor="#ddffdd"
| February 19 || Seton Hall* || No. 12 || Boshamer Stadium • Chapel Hill, NC || 4–2 || Pence (1–0) || Downing (0–1) || Peterson (1) || 2,632 || 2–1 || –
|-bgcolor="#ddffdd"
| February 21 || Radford* || No. 12 || Boshamer Stadium • Chapel Hill, NC  || 14–2 || Percival (1–0) || Seitz (0–1) || None || 2,324 || 3–1 || –
|-bgcolor="#ddffdd"
| February 22 || Longwood* || No. 12 || Boshamer Stadium • Chapel Hill, NC  || 10–0 || Knapp (1–0) || Taylor (0–1) || Eaise (1) || 2,013 || 4–1 || –
|-bgcolor="#ffdddd"
| February 24 || at No. 11 ECU* || No. 12 || Clark–LeClair Stadium • Greenville, NC || 5–6 || <small> Lunsford-Shenkman (1–1) || Pence (1–1) || Root (1) || 6,003 || 4–2 || –
|-bgcolor="#bbbbbb"
| February 25 || at No. 11 ECU* || No. 12 || Clark–LeClair Stadium • Greenville, NC || Postponed || || || || || || –
|-bgcolor="#ffdddd"
| February 26 || No. 11 ECU* || No. 12 || Boshamer Stadium • Chapel Hill, NC || 5–6 || Ritchie (1–0) || <small> Szestowicki (0–1) || Spivey (1) || 4,042 || 4–3 || –
|-bgcolor="#ddffdd"
| February 28 || VCU* || No. 13 || Boshamer Stadium • Chapel Hill, NC || 10–4 || Peterson (1–0) || Peters (1–1) || None || 1,974 || 5–3 || –

|-bgcolor="#ddffdd"
| March 1 || VCU* || No. 13 || Boshamer Stadium • Chapel Hill, NC || 14–10 || Eaise (1–1) || Walton (0–1) || None || 2,028 || 6–3 || –
|-bgcolor="#ddffdd"
| March 3 || Stony Brook* || No. 13 || Boshamer Stadium • Chapel Hill, NC || 3–2 <small> F/11 || Poston (1–0) || O'Neill (0–2) || None || 2,104 || 7–3 || –
|-bgcolor="#ddffdd"
| March 4 || Stony Brook* || No. 13 || Boshamer Stadium • Chapel Hill, NC || 7–5 || Bovair (1–0) || Fero (0–2) || None || 1,338 || 8–3 || –
|-bgcolor="#ddffdd"
| March 5 || Stony Brook* || No. 13 || Boshamer Stadium • Chapel Hill, NC || 15–4 || Knapp (2–0) || Smink (0–3) || None || 2,902 || 9–3 || –
|-bgcolor="#ddffdd"
| March 7 || Western Carolina* || No. 14 || Boshamer Stadium • Chapel Hill, NC || 8–4 <small> F/5 || Percival (2–0) || Bright (0–1) || None || 2,334 || 10–3 || –
|-bgcolor="#ddffdd"
| March 8 || Penn State* || No. 14 || Boshamer Stadium • Chapel Hill, NC || 15–5 || Berkwich (1–0) || Miller (1–2) || None || 1,896 || 11–3 || –
|-bgcolor="#ffdddd"
| March 10 || Virginia || No. 14 || Boshamer Stadium • Chapel Hill, NC || 3–7 || Tonas (1–0) || Carlson (0–1) || Berry (2) || 1,960 || 11–4 || 0–1
|-bgcolor="#ffdddd"
| March 11 || Virginia || No. 14 || Boshamer Stadium • Chapel Hill, NC || 4–8 || Hodorovich (1–0) || Bovair (1–1) || None || 3,162 || 11–5 || 0–2
|-bgcolor="#ddffdd"
| March 11 || Virginia || No. 14 || Boshamer Stadium • Chapel Hill, NC || 6–0 || Poston (2–0) || O'Connor (1–1) || None || 3,103 || 12–5 || 1–2
|-bgcolor="#ddffdd"
| March 14 || at Charlotte* || No. 18 || Robert and Mariam Hayes Stadium • Charlotte, NC || 16–3 || Eaise (2–1) || Spolyar (1–2) || None || 1,522 || 13–5 || 1–2
|-bgcolor="#ddffdd"
| March 15 || High Point* || No. 18 || Boshamer Stadium • Chapel Hill, NC || 16–2 || Sandy (1–0) || Duffy (0–2) || None || 1,769 || 14–5 || 1–2
|-bgcolor="#ddffdd"
| March 17 || at Pittsburgh || No. 18 || Charles L. Cost Field • Pittsburgh, PA || 17–7 || Bovair (2–1) || Sokol (2–1) || None || 289 || 15–5 || 2–2
|-bgcolor="#bbbbbb"
| March 18 || at Pittsburgh || No. 18 || Charles L. Cost Field • Pittsburgh, PA || Canceled || || || || || ||
|-bgcolor="#bbbbbb"
| March 19 || at Pittsburgh || No. 18 || Charles L. Cost Field • Pittsburgh, PA || Canceled || || || || || ||
|-
| March 21 || NC A&T* || || Boshamer Stadium • Chapel Hill, NC || || || || || || ||
|-
| March 23 || Duke || || Boshamer Stadium • Chapel Hill, NC || || || || || || ||
|-
| March 24 || Duke || || Boshamer Stadium • Chapel Hill, NC || || || || || || ||
|-
| March 25 || Duke || || Boshamer Stadium • Chapel Hill, NC || || || || || || ||
|-
| March 28 || Coastal Carolina* || || Boshamer Stadium • Chapel Hill, NC || || || || || || ||
|-
| March 31 || at Notre Dame || || Frank Eck Stadium • South Bend, IN || || || || || || ||

|-
| April 1 || at Notre Dame || || Frank Eck Stadium • South Bend, IN || || || || || || ||
|-
| April 2 || at Notre Dame || || Frank Eck Stadium • South Bend, IN || || || || || || ||
|-
| April 4 || vs. South Carolina* || || Truist Field • Charlotte, NC || || || || || || ||
|-
| April 6 || at Georgia Tech || || Russ Chandler Stadium • Atlanta, GA || || || || || || ||
|-
| April 7 || at Georgia Tech || || Russ Chandler Stadium • Atlanta, GA || || || || || || ||
|-
| April 8 || at Georgia Tech || || Russ Chandler Stadium • Atlanta, GA || || || || || || ||
|-
| April 11 || Queens* || || Boshamer Stadium • Chapel Hill, NC || || || || || || ||
|-
| April 13 || Miami (FL) || || Boshamer Stadium • Chapel Hill, NC || || || || || || ||
|-
| April 14 || Miami (FL) || || Boshamer Stadium • Chapel Hill, NC || || || || || || ||
|-
| April 15 || Miami (FL) || || Boshamer Stadium • Chapel Hill, NC || || || || || || ||
|-
| April 18 || Charlotte* || || Boshamer Stadium • Chapel Hill, NC || || || || || || ||
|-
| April 21 || Boston College || || Boshamer Stadium • Chapel Hill, NC || || || || || || ||
|-
| April 22 || Boston College || || Boshamer Stadium • Chapel Hill, NC || || || || || || ||
|-
| April 23 || Boston College || || Boshamer Stadium • Chapel Hill, NC || || || || || || ||
|-
| April 25 || UNCW* || || Boshamer Stadium • Chapel Hill, NC || || || || || || ||
|-
| April 28 || at Virginia Tech || || English Field • Blacksburg, VA || || || || || || ||
|-
| April 29 || at Virginia Tech || || English Field • Blacksburg, VA || || || || || || ||
|-
| April 30 || at Virginia Tech || || English Field • Blacksburg, VA || || || || || || ||

|-
| May 2 || Campbell* || || Boshamer Stadium • Chapel Hill, NC || || || || || || ||
|-
| May 3 || at ECU*  <small> Rescheduled from Feb. 25 || || Clark–LeClair Stadium • Greenville, NC || || || || || || || 
|-
| May 9 || Gardner-Webb* || || Boshamer Stadium • Chapel Hill, NC || || || || || || ||
|-
| May 11 || NC State || || Boshamer Stadium • Chapel Hill, NC || || || || || || ||
|-
| May 12 || NC State || || Boshamer Stadium • Chapel Hill, NC || || || || || || ||
|-
| May 13 || NC State || || Boshamer Stadium • Chapel Hill, NC || || || || || || ||
|-
| May 16 || at Coastal Carolina* || || Springs Brooks Stadium • Conway, SC || || || || || || ||
|-
| May 18 || at Clemson || || Doug Kingsmore Stadium • Clemson, SC || || || || || || ||
|-
| May 19 || at Clemson || || Doug Kingsmore Stadium • Clemson, SC || || || || || || ||
|-
| May 20 || at Clemson || || Doug Kingsmore Stadium • Clemson, SC || || || || || || ||

|- 
! style="" | Postseason
|-

|-
| May 23-28 || TBD || || Durham Bulls Athletic Park • Durham, NC || || || || || || ||

Rankings from D1Baseball

Rankings

References

North Carolina Tar Heels
North Carolina Tar Heels baseball seasons
North Carolina Tar Heels baseball